Pamela Adlon has starred in many feature films, television shows, and video games. She is known for her performances in Lucky Louie (2006), Louie (2010–2015), and Better Things (2016–2022). She also has had major performances in The Facts of Life (1983–1984), Californication (2007–2014), and guest appearances in The Jeffersons (1984), Boston Legal (2007–2008), Parenthood (2012), and This Is Us (2020). She is also a well known voice artist. Her voice credits include the animated programs Bobby's World (1992–1998), Rugrats (1992–2004), Recess (1997–2001), King of the Hill (1997–2010), Phineas and Ferb (2010–2013), Bob's Burgers (2012–2020), and Milo Murphy's Law (2016–2019).

Live-action filmography

Film

Television

Voice-over filmography

Film

Television

Web

Video games

References 

American filmographies
Actress filmographies